Alessandro Zezzos (1848, in Venice – 1914, in Vittorio Veneto) was an Italian painter of genre scenes, costume scenes, portraits, and vedute, in watercolors and oils.

He studied under Giacomo Favretto, Alessandro Milesi, and Luigi Nono at the Academy of Fine Arts in his native Venice. In 1873, he exhibited in Venice: Né sposo né figlio and Scena famigliare. In 1877 at Paris, Les saltimbanques and Les pigeons de Saint Marc. He was active as a painter in Venice. Among his watercolors are Le rondini, exhibited at Turin in 1880; Una calle, exhibited at the 1891 Mostra Triennale of the Brera Academy.  In 1881 at Milan, displayed the paintings: Mercante di ventagli; At the Predica, Half-figure of a Girl; and Popolana. In 1883 in Rome, exhibited: The Lovers.  He painted Love Letter, Una fuga nel 1700; and The Dockside of San Marco. From 1877 to 1878 he sent the following paintings to Paris: Pigeons of St Mark, El-Mazrama (Mouchoir of the Sultan), Los Saltimbanques, and A venetian - A Daughter of the People.

He had a retrospective exhibit at the Castello Sforzesco of Milan in 1937. Umberto Boccioni was one of his pupils. Among his colleagues and fellow pupils of Favretto were Bartolomeo Bezzi, Guglielmo Ciardi, Antonio Dal Zotto, Pietro Fragiacomo, Emilio Marsili, Luigi Nono, Augusto Sezanne, and Ettore Tito.

Notes

References

1848 births
1914 deaths
19th-century Italian painters
Italian male painters
20th-century Italian painters
20th-century Italian male artists
Painters from Venice
Italian vedutisti
Italian genre painters
Italian costume genre painters
19th-century Italian male artists